is a Finnish family magazine published in Helsinki, Finland. The magazine is known for its columns, an anecdote column called "Nitrodisko", its crosswords, and the weekly "Missä Jallu luuraa?" (Where is Jallu hiding?).

History and profile
Apu was founded in 1933 by Finnish publisher A-lehdet. It was the first magazine of Finnish publisher A-lehdet, now a large publishing group with a portfolio of 18 magazines. It was founded during a recession to help the unemployed persons, who were its exclusive resellers, hence its name meaning "help" in Finnish. The founder and first editor-in-chief was Yrjö Lyytikäinen. The magazine is based in Helsinki and is published 49 issues per year. In 2009 its editor-in-chief was Matti Saari. Juha Vuorinen has been a columnist for the publication since April 2016.

Circulation
Apu had a circulation of 224,500 copies in 2006. In 2007 the magazine had a certified readership of 683,000 and its circulation was 215,525 copies. The 2010 circulation of the magazine was 168,780 copies. Its circulation was 160,277 copies in 2011 and 149,050 copies in 2012. In 2013 Apu was the fifth best-selling magazine in Finland with a circulation of 148,491 copies.

Personnel
Notable editors have included, alphabetically:
Veikko Ennala (1950s–60s)
Eve Hietamies
Heikki Hietamies (1979–)
Kaarina Helakisa (1969–1972)
Juha Itkonen
Matti Jämsä (1953–?)
Yrjö Lyytikäinen (1933 founder and first editor-in-chief)
Juha Numminen (special editor 1984–1988, editor 1998–2003)
Arto Paasilinna (1968–1970)
Matti Saari (current editor-in-chief)
Markku Veijalainen (Editor-in-chief 1995–1999)

Notable columnists have included:
Heidi Hautala
Paavo Lipponen – satrap-stir about third column in Apu in spring 2004
Arto Paasilinna (1975–1988)
Yrjö Rautio
Ilmari Turja
Juha Väätäinen (1970s)
Juha Vuorinen

References

 A-lehdet (2008), "Mediaguide: Apu", mediaguide.a-lehdet.fi, Updated in 2008, Retrieved January 2009.
 A-lehdet (2009), "A-lehdet: The challenge of relevance", www.a-lehdet.fi, Updated in 2009, Retrieved January 2009.

External links
  Official website

1933 establishments in Finland
Finnish-language magazines
Magazines established in 1933
Magazines published in Helsinki
Weekly magazines published in Finland